Black Canyon City is an unincorporated community and census-designated place (CDP) in Yavapai County, Arizona, United States. The population was 2,837 at the 2010 census, up from 2,697 in 2000.

Geography
Black Canyon City is located at  (34.069719, -112.139466), at an elevation of 1,975 feet (602 m).

Black Canyon City is located in southern Yavapai County and is approximately 22 miles north of Phoenix.  Included in the southern part of Black Canyon City is the community of Rock Springs. It is served by Interstate 17, which bisects the city. I-17 is the main north-south freeway between Phoenix and Flagstaff. The Agua Fria river runs right through the center of Black Canyon City and the river empties into Lake Pleasant to the southwest.

Black Canyon City is becoming a bedroom exurb of Phoenix with the continued rapid growth of Phoenix northward. The assessed value of Black Canyon City property more than doubled between 2000 and 2007.

History
Black Canyon City has been known by several names, including Goddard or Goddards, Cañon, and Black Canyon. Goddard's was a stage stop on the Phoenix to Prescott line, a military stopover en route to Fort Whipple and Fort Verde during Territorial days, and a supply center for mines in the southern Bradshaw Mountains.

The area was first settled by people of Anglo-European origin in the 1870s, and the first post office was established as Cañon in May 1894, with postmaster Charles E. Goddard, and was discontinued in October 1899. It was reestablished again from February 1903 to November 1906. An early settler was Jack Swilling and his wife Trinidad Swilling, who moved there in 1871. The walls of his ranch house, Swillings Cabin – the community's oldest building  still stand.

In 2004, residents proposed incorporating the area as a town and submitted sufficient signatures to hold an election.
However, the initiative failed with 72% voting against incorporation.

Demographics

Black Canyon's population in the 1960 census was estimated at 100.

Black Canyon City appeared on the 1990 U.S. Census as a census-designated place (CDP).

As of the census of 2000, there were 2,697 people, 1,241 households, and 771 families residing in the CDP. The racial makeup of the CDP was 95.9% White, 0.2% Black or African American, 1.2% Native American, 0.2% Asian, <0.1% Pacific Islander, 0.7% from other races, and 1.8% from two or more races. 3.4% of the population were Hispanic or Latino of any race.

There were 1,241 households, out of which 18.0% had children under the age of 18 living with them, 51.5% were married couples living together, 6.8% had a female householder with no husband present, and 37.8% were non-families. 30.9% of all households were made up of individuals, and 13.8% had someone living alone who was 65 years of age or older. The average household size was 2.17 and the average family size was 2.64.

In the CDP, the population was spread out, with 17.5% under the age of 18, 4.9% from 18 to 24, 23.8% from 25 to 44, 32.3% from 45 to 64, and 21.6% who were 65 years of age or older. The median age was 47 years. For every 100 females, there were 109.7 males. For every 100 females age 18 and over, there were 108.1 males.

The median income for a household in the CDP was $32,908, and the median income for a family was $41,193. Males had a median income of $36,310 versus $22,750 for females. The per capita income for the CDP was $20,117. About 7.6% of families and 12.9% of the population were below the poverty line, including 16.9% of those under age 18 and 9.7% of those age 65 or over.

Superior water quality standards
Black Canyon City, in common with such other Yavapai county communities as Camp Verde, Cornville, Rimrock and Village of Oak Creek, has well water exceeding the current maximum limit of 10 ppb arsenic. Two thirds of the Black Canyon City residents and most of the businesses are served by a water District. The remaining residents are served by a private water company. Both water systems have invested heavily in arsenic treatment facilities and the water in Black Canyon City fully meets all federal standards. Both are continuously monitored by  ADEQ

Parks 
Black Canyon City has two parks
 Black Canyon Heritage Park – about 8 acres with accessible trail that provides riparian, birding, butterfly and other environmental experiences in a family friendly, nurturing setting. Visitor Center is managed by the Black Canyon City Chamber of Commerce with lots of information on the area as well as Arizona overall. See https://blackcanyonheritagepark.org/
 High Desert Park – about 89-acre park with ramadas, baseball field, and more.  See https://www.yavapai.us/facilities/yavapai-county-parks/high-desert-park

Education
Most residents are within the Cañon Elementary School District, while some are in the Mayer Unified School District.  the Cañon district sends high school students and junior high level special education students to the Deer Valley Unified School District.

Public safety
Police protection in the Black Canyon City area is the responsibility of the Southern Area Command of the Yavapai County Sheriff's Office.

Notable people
 Jacob Snively (1809–1871), a surveyor, civil engineer, officer of the Texian Army and the Army of the Republic of Texas, California 49er, miner, and Arizona pioneer.
 John W. "Jack" Swilling (1830–1878), an early pioneer in the Arizona Territory, prospector, Confederate soldier, and commonly credited as one of the original founders of Phoenix, Arizona

Fire district
The fire department was established in 1969 and was originally called "Canyon Community Volunteer Fire Department." In 1983, the department became a Fire District and the name was changed to Black Canyon Fire District.

Effective May 22, 2017, Black Canyon Fire District consolidated into the Daisy Mountain Fire District.

See also

 List of historic properties in Black Canyon City, Arizona

Notes

External links
 Black Canyon City profile , by Arizona Department of Commerce
 GODDARD(s) or CANYON
 Swillings Cabin
 Yavapai County Sheriff's Office

Census-designated places in Yavapai County, Arizona